Anthony Nash may refer to:

Anthony Nash (hurler) (born 1984), Irish hurler
Tony Nash (actor)
Tony Nash (bobsledder) (1936–2022), British bobsledder
Tony Nash (rugby league) (fl. 1942), Australian rugby league player